This is a list of trolleybus systems in Spain by autonomous community.  It includes all trolleybus systems, past and present.

Andalusia

Aragon

Basque Country

Cantabria

Catalonia

Galicia

Madrid

Valencia

See also

 List of trolleybus systems, for all other countries
 List of town tramway systems in Spain
 List of light-rail transit systems
 List of rapid transit systems
 Trolleybus usage by country

Sources

Books and periodicals 
 Murray, Alan. 2000. '"World Trolleybus Encyclopaedia". Reading, Berkshire, UK: Trolleybooks.
 Peschkes, Robert. 1993. "World Gazetteer of Tram, Trolleybus, and Rapid Transit Systems, Part Three: Europe". London: Rapid Transit Publications.
 Trolleybus Magazine (ISSN 0266-7452). National Trolleybus Association (UK). Bimonthly.

References

Spain
 
Spain transport-related lists